The 1891 Colorado Silver and Gold football team was an American football team that represented the University of Colorado as an independent during the 1891 college football season. The team has no head coach and compiled a record of 1–4 which included the program's first win.

Schedule

References

Colorado
Colorado Buffaloes football seasons
Colorado Silver and Gold football